Aaron James Draplin (born October 15, 1973) is an American graphic designer, entrepreneur and author based in Portland, Oregon.

Early life 
Aaron Draplin was born in Detroit, Michigan on October 15, 1973, to parents Jim and Lauren Draplin. At 17, Draplin started his associate degree at Northwestern Michigan College; he graduated in 1993. At 19 he moved to Bend, Oregon to pursue his career in graphic design. After five years, he moved to Minneapolis to finish his design degree at the Minneapolis College of Art and Design, graduating in 2000.

Career
He started his career with a snowboard graphic for Solid Snowboards. In April 2000, he accepted an art director position at Snowboarder magazine. He won Art Director of the Year for Primedia 2000. In 2002, he became a senior designer at Cinco Design Office of Portland. His clients have included Nike, Burton Snowboards, Esquire, Red Wing, Ford Motor Company and the Obama Administration.

Draplin has been featured on TED Talks and talks at Google. In 2019 he designed the Star Ribbon, a US postal stamp. Draplin is the co-founder of and designer for the Field Notes brand. Draplin started his own firm, the Draplin Design Company.

Awards 
Art Director of the Year, Snowboarder Magazine, EMAP Publishing, Los Angeles, California, Spring 2001

Publications 
 Pretty Much Everything, (2016) Abrams Books , is a mid-career survey that includes his work—posters, record covers and logos.

References

External links 
 Draplin Design Co.

1973 births
American graphic designers
Artists from Detroit
Artists from Portland, Oregon
Living people